Survey may refer to:

Statistics and human research
 Statistical survey, a method for collecting quantitative information about items in a population
 Survey (human research), including opinion polls

Spatial measurement
 Surveying, the technique and science of measuring positions and distances on Earth

Types and methods
 Photogrammetry, a method of collecting information using aerial photography and satellite images
 Cadastral surveyor, used to document land ownership, by the production of documents, diagrams, plats, and maps
 Dominion Land Survey, the method used to divide most of Western Canada into one-square-mile sections for agricultural and other purposes
 Public Land Survey System, a method used in the United States to survey and identify land parcels
 Survey township, a square unit of land, six miles (~9.7 km) on a side, done by the U.S. Public Land Survey System
 Construction surveying, the locating of structures relative to a reference line, used in the construction of buildings, roads, mines, and tunnels
 Deviation survey, used in the oil industry to measure a borehole's departure from the vertical
 Archaeological field survey, the collection of information by archaeologists prior to excavation

Geospatial survey organizations
 Survey of India, India's central agency in charge of mapping and surveying
 Ordnance Survey, a national mapping agency for Great Britain
 U.S. National Geodetic Survey, performing geographic surveys as part of the U.S. Department of Commerce

Geological surveys
 Geological survey, an investigation of the subsurface of the ground to create a geological map or model

Types
 Cave survey, the three-dimensional mapping of caverns
 Geophysical survey, the systematic collection of geophysical data for spatial studies
 Hydrographic survey, the gathering of information about navigable waters for the purposes of safe navigation of vessels
 Soil survey, the mapping of the properties and varieties of soil in a given area

Geological survey organizations
 British Geological Survey, a body which carries out geological surveys and monitors the UK landmass
 United States Geological Survey, a government scientific research agency which studies the landscape of the United States

Astronomical surveys
 Astronomical survey, imaging or mapping regions of the sky
 Durchmusterung, a German word for a systematic survey of objects or data, generally used in astronomy
 Redshift survey, an astronomical survey of a section of the sky to calculate the distance of objects from Earth

Other types of survey
 Field survey or field research
 Site survey, inspection of an area where work is proposed
 Vessel safety survey, required for ships
 Survey article, a scholarly publication to summarize an area of research

See also
 
 
 Land survey (disambiguation)
 Surveyor (disambiguation)
 Survey says (disambiguation)